Frasin is a commune in Dondușeni District, Moldova. It is composed of three villages: Caraiman, Codrenii Noi and Frasin (formerly Frasân).

References

Communes of Dondușeni District